Hugh Paterson Donald  (1908–1989) was a New Zealand-born, British biologist, noteworthy as an important contributor to Peter Medawar's research on skin grafts.

Hugh P. Donald was educated at Lincoln College in New Zealand, where he acquired three degrees and training as a plant geneticist. At the beginning of his career he was interested in finding new varieties of wheat, but the plant geneticist Otto Frankel advised him that there were more job opportunities in agricultural research on animals. In 1934 Donald joined Edinburgh University's Institute of Animal Genetics. There for two years from 1934 to 1936 he did research under the supervision of Rowena Lamy on Drosophila genetics and completed his Ph.D. thesis in 1936. According to the geneticist A. H. Sturtevant's A History of Genetics, Francis Crew and Rowena Lamy gave in 1935 an explanation for why some specific mutations were autosomal in one fruit-fly species and sex-linked in a closely related fruit-fly species, and the explanation was confirmed in 1936 by Donald. In 1936 he was appointed junior lecturer in animal husbandry and assistant to Alick Buchanan-Smith at the Institute of Animal Genetics, Shothead Farm, Balerno. There Donald ran both the farm and the breeding programme, did research and much of the manual farm work, and also taught undergraduates.

As successor to Robert George White, Donald held an appointment from 1951 to 1973 as Director of the Agricultural Research Council's Animal Breeding Research Organisation (ABRO). He held an appointment from 1973 to 1989 as Honorary Professor at the University of Edinburgh. He was the coauthor with I. Michael Lerner of Modern Developments in Animal Breeding.

Awards and honors
 1937 — Elected Fellow of the Royal Society of Edinburgh
 1974 — Awarded Commander of the British Empire
 1974–1975 — President of the British Society of Animal Production

Selected publications

References

External links
 

1908 births
1989 deaths
20th-century British biologists
Fellows of the Royal Society of Edinburgh
Commanders of the Order of the British Empire
Lincoln University (New Zealand) alumni
Academics of the University of Edinburgh
New Zealand emigrants to the United Kingdom